The nineteenth season of the Case Closed anime was directed by Kōjin Ochi and produced by TMS Entertainment and Yomiuri Telecasting Corporation. The series is based on Gosho Aoyama's Case Closed manga series. In Japan, the series is titled  but was changed due to legal issues with the title Detective Conan. The series focuses on the adventures of teenage detective Shinichi Kudo who was turned into a child by a poison called APTX 4869, but continues working as a detective under the alias Conan Edogawa.

The episodes use six pieces of theme music: three opening themes and three ending themes. The first opening theme is "As the Dew" by Garnet Crow until episode 582. The second opening theme beginning in episode 583 is "Summer Time Gone" by Mai Kuraki. The opening theme starting on episode 602 is "tear drops" by Caos Caos Caos. The ending theme "Hello Mr. My Yesterday" by Hundred Percent Free is used for episodes 565 to 587. Starting 588, the ending theme is "Tomorrow is the Last Time" by Mai Kuraki until episode 601. The ending theme  by Hundred Percent Free is used for the remainder of the episodes.

The season aired between February 27, 2010 and February 12, 2011 on Nippon Television Network System in Japan. The season was later collected and released in ten DVD compilations by Shogakukan between January 28, 2011 and October 28, 2011, in Japan.


Episode list

References

2010 Japanese television seasons
2011 Japanese television seasons
Season19